Scott Clements (born July 19, 1981) is a professional poker player from Mount Vernon, Washington, United States, who has won titles in both World Poker Tour (WPT) and World Series of Poker (WSOP) events.

Clements has twice won championship bracelets at the WSOP, winning the $3,000 Omaha Hi-Lo tournament in 2006 and the $1,500 Pot-Limit Omaha event in 2007.

In addition to his success in Omaha games at the WSOP, Clements has also claimed victory on the WPT, winning the 2006 Canadian Open Championship and taking home over $250,000. In November 2007, he won the second annual WPT North American Poker Classic at Fallsview Casino and winning over $1,137,593.

As of 2018, Clements' total live tournament winnings exceed $7,650,000. His 56 cashes at the WSOP account for over $2,800,000 of those winnings.

In 2015 Clements was one of the 18 coaches featured in Jonathan Little’s bestselling book “Excelling at No Limit Hold’em”

World Series of Poker Bracelets

Notes

1981 births
American poker players
World Series of Poker bracelet winners
World Poker Tour winners
People from Mount Vernon, Washington
Living people